Catherine Anne Cox  (born 24 May 1976) is a former Australia netball international and current netball commentator. Between 1997 and 2013, she made 108 senior appearances for Australia. She was a prominent member of the Australia teams that won gold medals at the 2002 Commonwealth Games and the 2007 and 2011 World Netball Championships. She was also a member of the Australia teams that won silver medals at the 2003 World Netball Championships and the 2006 and 2010 Commonwealth Games. Cox captained Australia on seven occasions, including when they won the 2011 Constellation Cup.

During the Commonwealth Bank Trophy era, Cox played for Sydney Swifts. She was a member of Swifts teams that won premierships in 2004, 2006 and 2007. Between 2008 and 2011, she captained New South Wales Swifts, including when they won the inaugural 2008 ANZ Championship. During her playing career, she also captained Perth Orioles and West Coast Fever. In her final season as a player, Cox won a fifth premiership with the 2014 Melbourne Vixens.

Early life, family and education
Cox was born in Whangārei in New Zealand's Northland Region. She is the daughter of Frances and Neville Cox. Both of her parents are originally from New Zealand. They met in Hamilton, before moving to Northland where they lived for seven years. Frances was a teacher at a school in Whau Valley and Neville was a manager at the Arthur Yates seed company. Cox was born in Whangarei Hospital on 24 May 1976. When she was three months old, her family moved from their Mount Parihaka home to South Island. The family then moved to Australia when she was six. Cox was raised in Sydney. She attended 
Mount St Benedict College and Oakhill College. She graduated from the latter in 1994. Cox started playing netball at age 11, with the Hills District Netball Association. Cox is the mother of a daughter, Harper (born February 2016).

Playing career

New South Wales
Between 1992 and 2004, Cox represented New South Wales in the Australian National Netball Championships at under-17, under-19 and open levels.

Mobil Superleague
During the Mobil Superleague era, Cox played for the Australian Institute of Sport in 1995 and for Sydney Cenovis in 1996. Sydney Cenovis also featured a young Liz Ellis and were coached by Julie Fitzgerald.

Commonwealth Bank Trophy

Sydney Swifts
Between 1997 and 1999 and again between 2002 and 2007, Cox made 135 appearances for Sydney Swifts in the Commonwealth Bank Trophy league. She was a member of Swifts teams that won premierships in 2004, 2006 and 2007. Between 2004 and 2006, she also helped Swifts win three minor premierships. Between 2004 and 2007, she played in five successive grand finals for Swifts. Her team mates at Sydney Swifts included Liz Ellis, Megan Anderson and Susan Pratley. She formed a notable partnership with Pratley that also saw them play together for New South Wales Swifts and Australia. Between 2003 and 2007 she was named in five successive Margaret Pewtress Teams of the Year.

Perth Orioles
Between 2000 and 2001, Cox made 25 appearances for Perth Orioles in the Commonwealth Bank Trophy league. She co-captained Orioles during both seasons. She was also named Orioles' Player of the Year for both seasons.

ANZ Championship era

New South Wales Swifts
Between 2008 and 2011, Cox made 57 appearances for New South Wales Swifts in the ANZ Championship. She also captained Swifts during these four seasons, including when they won the inaugural 2008 ANZ Championship and the 2010 minor premiership. In 2008 she played in her sixth successive grand final and was named MVP. In 2010 Cox made her 200th combined Commonwealth Bank Trophy/ANZ Championship game in Round 13 against Melbourne Vixens.

Cox's playing career with Swifts ended in controversial circumstances. Following an "internal review", Julie Fitzgerald was replaced as Swifts head coach by Lisa Beehag. The review was conducted during the 2011 season. Cox publicly criticized Netball New South Wales for distracting players with the review and even alleged that it was responsible for Swifts losing the 2011 minor semi-final. Beehag subsequently informed Cox that she would not be needed as either as captain or player the following season and Cox then departed for West Coast Fever.

West Coast Fever
In August 2011, Cox joined West Coast Fever. During the 2012 and 2013 seasons, Cox captained Fever and made 26 appearances.

Melbourne Vixens
In February 2014, Cox joined Melbourne Vixens.
In April 2014, Cox announced she would be retiring as a netball player at the end of the
2014 season. In May, Cox played her 250th combined Commonwealth Bank Trophy/ANZ Championship game in Round 10 against New South Wales Swifts. She subsequently went on to help the 2014 Melbourne Vixens win both the minor premiership and the overall championship before retiring.

Grand finals

Australia
Between 1997 and 2013, Cox made 108 senior appearances for Australia. Between 1994 and 1996 she had represented Australia at under-21 level. She was a standout player in the 1996 World Youth Netball Championships grand final in which Australia beat New Zealand.
She made her senior debut on 11 June 1997, aged 21, in a 65–38 win against South Africa at Challenge Stadium in Perth.

Cox was overlooked for the 1998 Commonwealth Games and the 1999 World Netball Championships. After being left out of the 1998 Commonwealth Games squad, Cox considered switching to play for New Zealand after she was approached by Netball New Zealand. However she subsequently re-established herself in the Australia team and was a prominent member of the Australia teams that won gold medals at the 2002 Commonwealth Games and the 2007 and 2011 World Netball Championships. Cox was vice-captain of the 2011 Australia team. She was also a member of the Australia teams that won silver medals at the 2003 World Netball Championships and the 2006 and 2010 Commonwealth Games. In both 2004 and 2005, Cox was named Australian International Player of the Year.

Cox captained Australia on seven occasions. She first captained Australia in November 2004 when they lost 50–42 to New Zealand. She next captained Australia in October 2011 against England, after regular captain, Natalie von Bertouch, was injured. During the same match, Cox also scored her 2000th goal for Australia. She subsequently captained Australia when they won the 2011 Constellation Cup.

On 20 September 2012, during a 2012 Constellation Cup match against New Zealand, Cox made her 100th Test appearance for Australia. As a result she became only the fourth Australia netball international, after Vicki Wilson, Sharelle McMahon and Liz Ellis, to reach the century mark.

Commentator
Since 2015 Cox has worked as a netball commentator. She made her broadcast debut, when together with Sharelle McMahon, Liz Ellis and Kelli Underwood, she was part of the Fox Sports (Australia) commentary team that covered the 2015 ANZ Championship season. In 2015 Cox, Ellis and McMahon toured as part of a stage show named The Centurions, celebrating the careers and back stories of three Australia netball internationals who had played more than 100 international matches. Since 2017, Cox has worked for Nine, providing commentary for their Suncorp Super Netball, Netball World Cup and Constellation Cup coverage.

Honours
Australia
World Netball Championships
Winners: 2007, 2011
Runners Up: 2003
Commonwealth Games
Winners: 2002
Runners Up: 2006, 2010
Sydney Swifts
Commonwealth Bank Trophy
Winners: 2004, 2006, 2007
Runners up: 1998, 2003, 2005
Minor premierships: 2004, 2005, 2006
New South Wales Swifts
ANZ Championship
Winners: 2008
Minor Premiership: 2010
Melbourne Vixens
ANZ Championship
Winners: 2014
Minor Premierships: 2014
Individual Awards

References

1976 births
Living people
Australian netball commentators
Australia international netball players
Australia international Fast5 players
Australian netball players
Members of the Order of Australia
Netball players from New South Wales
Commonwealth Games medallists in netball
Commonwealth Games gold medallists for Australia
Commonwealth Games silver medallists for Australia
Netball players at the 2002 Commonwealth Games
Netball players at the 2006 Commonwealth Games
Netball players at the 2010 Commonwealth Games
2003 World Netball Championships players
2007 World Netball Championships players
2011 World Netball Championships players
Australian Institute of Sport netball players
Sydney Swifts players
Perth Orioles players
New South Wales Swifts players
West Coast Fever players
Melbourne Vixens players
ANZ Championship players
Esso/Mobil Superleague players
New Zealand emigrants to Australia
Sportspeople from Whangārei
People educated at Oakhill College
Sport Australia Hall of Fame inductees
Medallists at the 2002 Commonwealth Games
Medallists at the 2006 Commonwealth Games
Medallists at the 2010 Commonwealth Games